Jigsaw is the fourth studio album by guitarist Mike Stern, released in 1989 through Atlantic Records and reissued on July 17, 2007 through Wounded Bird Records. The album reached #12 on Billboard's Top Contemporary Jazz Albums chart in 1989.

Track listing

Personnel
Mike Stern – guitar
Jim Beard – keyboard, synthesizer
Peter Erskine – drums (except tracks 1, 4, 5)
Dennis Chambers – drums (tracks 1, 4, 5)
Manolo Badrena – bongo, shaker
Don Alias – percussion
Jeff Andrews – bass
Bob Berg – saxophone
Michael Brecker – EWI
Malcolm Pollack – engineering
Paul Angelli – engineering
Patrick Dillett – engineering
UE Nastasi – engineering
Greg Calbi – mastering
Steve Khan – production
Christine Martin – production

Charts

References

External links
In Review: Mike Stern "Jigsaw" at Guitar Nine Records

Mike Stern albums
1989 albums
Atlantic Records albums